Algerian Arab sheep (also called Ouled Jellal and Western Thin-tailed) is a breed of domesticated sheep found throughout Algeria.  This breed does grow a carpet-grade wool, and is raised primarily for meat.

Characteristics
The rams are horned and the ewes are polled (hornless). Both sexes display white and are unicolored. Ewes lactate for approximately 180 days and provide  of milk to their offspring during that period.

The Algerian Arab have long legs that are well suited for walking for extended periods of time.  This breed is well adapted to live in arid climates.  From 1989 to 2003, the population increased from approximately 10 million to 11 million.

This breed is believed to have evolved from the Tadmit sheep in Algeria.

References

Sheep breeds originating in Algeria
Sheep breeds